Clay Pigeons is a 1998 black comedy film written by Matt Healy and directed by David Dobkin. The film stars Joaquin Phoenix, Vince Vaughn, and Janeane Garofalo.

It is the second film on-screen collaboration between Vaughn and Phoenix, the first film being Return to Paradise, released  in the same year.

Plot
In a field in Montana Earl, the best friend of young man Clay Bidwell shoots himself dead after confronting Clay over the ongoing affair he had been having with Earl's wife Amanda. Having just found out, he was distraught and wanted to make it look like Clay had murdered him.

Rushing back to town, Clay seeks help from Amanda to cover it up but she refuses to help as she doesn't want everyone knowing about the affair. With difficulty he manages to get the body into his pickup and get it to seem like Earl drove it down the incline, where it crashed and burned.

A short time after the funeral, Clay arrives home to find an unapologetic, half-naked Amanda pressing him to continue with their affair as if nothing has happened. Feeling guilty, Clay now resists Amanda's advances when she throws herself at him. Lester Long, who he inadventently befriends in the bar witnesses Amanda's behaviour.

After a jealous Amanda kills Gloria, a waitress Clay briefly dates, while they are making love she convinces him not to report it. He dumps the body in the lake, the next day Clay and Lester go fishing. A body floats to the surface which Clay can only assume is Gloria. Lester asks him to report it on his own so he isn't late to work.

Later on Clay comes across his Lester at his ex's place. Lester spends the whole day with Amanda, at the end of which he stabs her several times. Unbeknownst to Clay, he happens to be a serial killer. The following morning, Clay follows police cruisers to Amanda's and finds out she's been stabbed to death.

Soon enough, FBI agent Dale Shelby and her partner Reynard come to town and examine the unprofessionally controlled crime scene. They zero in on Clay as the prime suspect as they have video footage of his affair with Amanda, he was dating a now missing Gloria and he reported finding a third.

Lester has Clay meet him by the lake. He tells him he murdered the nagging Amanda in an attempt to "help" his "fishing buddy", leaving Clay horrified. The next day another body is found, so they drag the lake and find several more.

Clay finally tells the feds all he knows about Lester, but when they enquire at the trucking company they don't know him as he goes by Bobby there. Searching his house, they find a blood-stained knife and put him in jail. There, Lester visits him late without anyone seeing and hints about targeting Kimberly, a young waitress Clay knows. 

In the meantime, Lester goes to the local bar and hits on Dale, using the name Lloyd. He's charmed her when Kimberly, who he was waiting for, arrives. They abruptly leave and Dale suddenly realises he is suspicious.

In the police station Clay easily dupes the deputy, locking him in the cell and getting his car keys. He heads to the lake, where he finds Lester with his intended victim with a knife. As Dale approaches, Kimberly runs by and she searches for Lester in the woods.

Considered cleared of all the charges, Clay packs up his truck as he prepares to leave town. Dale checks in to make sure he doesn't have an inkling of Lester. However, on the road, he follows Clay into a diner. He gives Lester the cold shoulder, then Clay watches from the diner as he, introducing himself as Lyle, talks a man who looks like Sheriff Mooney into taking him along. Two police follow, as Clay drives off in the opposite direction.

Cast
 Joaquin Phoenix as Clay Bidwell
 Vince Vaughn as Lester Long
 Janeane Garofalo as Dale Shelby
 Georgina Cates as Amanda
 Gregory Sporleder as Earl
 Phil Morris as Agent Reynard
 Scott Wilson as Sheriff Dan Mooney
 Vince Vieluf as Deputy Barney
 Nikki Arlyn as Gloria Collins
 Joseph D. Reitman as Glen

Production
Clay Pigeons was developed under filmmakers Ridley and Tony Scott's company, Scott Free Productions.

Vaughn has described his character, Lester, as "a guy who isn’t necessarily from the West — that’s just an image he’s created of himself. Whatever his reality is — being badly hurt by women or whatever — he’s made it over, taking bits and pieces of things he’s seen in movies. He sees his life as a strange Western movie, with himself as the hero. He thinks he’s a sane person in an insane world."

Dobkin said of the characters, "I wanted everyone to be different than what they appear to be — the FBI agent who smokes pot, the small town sheriff who seems slow but is the one who figures [the murders] out in the end."

Reception
The film received mixed reviews. On Rotten Tomatoes the film has an approval rating of 61% based on reviews from 54 critics with the consensus: "Joaquin Phoenix, Janeane Garofalo, and Vince Vaughn play for kills in this dark comedy, but the film's aim misses some of those Clay Pigeons." On Metacritic the film has a score of 49/100 based on 26 reviews, indicating "mixed or average reviews".

References

External links
 
 
 
 
 

1998 films
1998 comedy films
1998 crime drama films
1998 directorial debut films
1998 independent films
1990s black comedy films
1990s crime drama films
1990s serial killer films
American black comedy films
American crime drama films
American independent films
American neo-noir films
American serial killer films
German black comedy films
German crime drama films
German independent films
German neo-noir films
German serial killer films
English-language German films
Films directed by David Dobkin
Films set in Montana
Films shot in California
Films shot in Utah
Scott Free Productions films
Gramercy Pictures films
PolyGram Filmed Entertainment films
1990s English-language films
1990s American films
1990s German films